La Place is a Dutch restaurant chain, owned by Jumbo (taken over from the bankrupt department store giant V&D). La Place has about 100 restaurants in the Netherlands, Belgium, Germany, Indonesia and the United States.

History
The first restaurant was opened on 17 September 1987 in Utrecht, Netherlands.

The first restaurant of the restaurant chain in Belgium was opened on 25 October 2007 in Antwerp. Another restaurant in Belgium opened in 2008. In March 2014 both were closed. In March 2010, a third La Place in Belgium opened on the second floor of the new mall K in Kortrijk in Kortrijk. It was also closed in 2014.

In September and November 2013 two new La Place restaurants were opened in Germany. The first one opened in Zweibrücken while the second one opened in Metzingen (Now Closed). On 23 May 2014 a restaurant was opened on Bali. The restaurant is located at the airport Ngurah Rai. On 1 July 2014 a second restaurant was opened at the same airport. On 4 August 2014 a restaurant was opened in the office of Google Inc. in New York City.

On 31 December 2015 V&D and its daughter La Place went bankrupt but continued to operate on Dutch government funds. On 26 January 2016 Jumbo, a Dutch supermarket chain, announced that it had acquired La Place out of bankruptcy for an undisclosed amount of money.

Restaurants
Number of restaurants per country as of 1 November 2021

References

External links
 

Restaurant chains in the Netherlands
Companies based in Utrecht (province)
Nieuwegein